Scuderia Milano was an Italian Formula One motor racing team founded in Milan by Arialdo and Emilio Ruggeri, two brothers who had raced Maseratis in the early post-war period. The team scored two World Championship points on its debut, when Felice Bonetto finished fifth at the 1950 Swiss Grand Prix. 

The team mostly raced modified Maserati 4CLT single-seaters with a shorter wheelbase, De Dion suspensions, and larger brakes. One Scuderia Milano original chassis, the 4CLT, was entered in the 1950 Italian Grand Prix with Bonetto at the wheel. He managed to qualify 23rd, three places ahead of his teammate Franco Comotti in a Maserati, but failed to start. The car was later purchased and modified by Scuderia Arzani-Volpini in 1955.

Complete World Championship results 
(key)

* Constructor's Championship not awarded until .

References

Formula One constructors
Formula One entrants
Italian auto racing teams
Italian racecar constructors
Sport in Milan